The Hongming Bridge is a historic stone arch bridge over the Xushan River in Keqiao District, Shaoxing, Zhejiang, China.

History
Originally built in the Song dynasty (960–1279), the bridge was rebuilt in 1796 during the era of Jiaqing Emperor of the Qing dynasty (1644–1911). 

In January 2017, it has been designated as a provincial cultural relic preservation organ by the Government of Zhejiang.

References

Bridges in Zhejiang
Arch bridges in China
Bridges completed in 1796
Qing dynasty architecture
Buildings and structures completed in 1796
1796 establishments in China